A Gest of Robyn Hode (also known as A Lyttell Geste of Robyn Hode, and hereafter referred to as Gest) is one of the earliest surviving texts of the Robin Hood tales. Gest (which meant tale or adventure) is a compilation of various Robin Hood tales, arranged as a sequence of adventures involving the yeoman outlaws Robin Hood and Little John, the poor knight Sir Richard at the Lee, the greedy abbot of St Mary's Abbey, the villainous Sheriff of Nottingham, and King Edward of England.

As a literary work, Gest was first studied in detail by William Hall Clawson in 1909. Research did not resume until 1968, when the medievalist D. C. Fowler published A Literary History of the Popular Ballad.

Gest as poetry 
Written in late Middle English poetic verse, Gest was originally considered an early example of an English language ballad, in which the verses are grouped in quatrains with an abcb rhyme scheme.
However, Douglas Gray, the first J. R. R. Tolkien Professor of English Literature and Language at the University of Oxford, considered the Robin Hood and Scottish Border ballads to be poems. He objected to the then-current definitions of a ballad as some ideal form, whose characteristics were distilled from the Child Ballads. When compared to "this notion of a 'pure ballad', the Robin Hood poems seem messy and anormalous", he contended Therefore, he titled his article The Robin Hood Poems, and not The Robin Hood Ballads.

Gray admitted that the Robin Hood tales, like most popular literature, are sometimes regarded as "sub-literary material", containing formulaic language and a "thin texture", especially "when they are read on the printed page". Additionally, he argued, that since Child had grouped all the Robin Hood 'ballads' together, some literary studies had "rashly based themselves on all the Robin Hood ballads in the collection", instead of discarding those of dubious value. (Maddicott also recognized this issue, and argued that since so little is known about the origins of the ballads from early manuscripts and early printed texts, internal evidence has to be used.) Gray further contended that, as oral poetry, each poem should be judged as a performance. He quoted Ruth Finnegan: "This is not a secondary or peripheral matter, but integral to the identity of the poem as actually realized". In an oral performance, a skillful raconteur can draw his audience in, making them part of his performance. Thus no two oral performances are identical. Gray points out that one of the characteristics of Gest are scenes with rapid dialogue or conversations, in which the formulaic diction, limited vocabulary, and stereotyped expressions are artfully used to express emotion. Such scenes lying dully on a page can spring into action when recited by one or two talented minstrels. (See Sung or Recited?.)

The Gest poet 
Gest is a compilation of many early Robin Hood tales, either in verse or prose, but most of them now lost. They were woven together into a single narrative poem by an unknown poet (herein called the Gest poet'). 
F. C. Child, arguing that there was only one poet, described the Gest poet as "a thoroughly congenial spirit." W. H. Clawson considered him "to have been exceedingly skillful", while J. B. Bessinger declared him as "original and transitional"[p 43]. Gray thought the weaving to have "been neatly done". J. C. Holt implied that there were two poets: the original poet who compiled the First, Second, and Fourth Fyttes as a single poem; and another less skilled poet who compiled the Third and Fifth Fyttes into the work produced by the original poet. Others, such as J. R. Maddicott, [et al.; list them], have considered him as less than adequate. They point to a narrative that is not sequential (it jumps back and forth between the tales); the transitions between tales are not smooth; there are inconsistencies within each tale, and between the tales.

 Gest poet's sources 
Child was one of the first to recognize that Gest contains ballads from two different traditions: the Barnsdale tradition (found in the First, Second, and Fourth Fyttes), and the Nottingham tradition (found in the Third, Fifth, and Sixth Fyttes). Clawson then attempted to identify the source ballads. J. C. Holt considers Clawson work as fundamental to a careful study of Gest, and admits there is no consensus on how many underlying tales were used, or which lines can be considered the work of the Gest poet. In contrast to Clawson, who struggled mightily to connect Gest with existing outlaw ballads, Holt's study indicated that none of the sources have survived, that the tales were not necessarily in verse form, and that the source tales come from several traditions. Why the Gest poet used these particular tales to construct this epic-length poem is unknown.

 Tale A, Episode 1 (First Fytte)
 The First Fytte begins with a now-lost light-hearted tale about Robin Hood and a poor knight. The original tale was obviously part of a Barnsdale tradition of Robin Hood, based upon the numerous references to local landmarks. When the Knight is accosted in Barnsdale, he mentions that he planned to spend the night in either Blyth or Doncaster.The remainder of the First Fytte is based on a 'Miracle of the Virgin Mary' story. The 'Miracle' was a moral story often told during religious services, and these stories were very popular. They generally concerned the Virgin Mary (or any of the Saints) being invoked as surety for a loan. The most common ending of a Miracle described an actual miracle to repay the loan. There was also a humorous ending where the repayment money is taken from a person in a religious order who in some way represented the Virgin or Saint. In this ending, this person is regarded as the messenger sent by the Virgin or Saint to repay the debt. The First Fytte ends with Robin Hood and his men outfitting the poor knight in a manner befitting a messenger of the Virgin Mary.
 Tale A, Episode 2 (Second Fytte)
 This Fytte has a darker tone. The first part of the Second Fytte appears to be based on another now-lost tale, where a knight repays his debt to an Abbot with money received from Robin Hood. Parts of the original tale remain, even though they do not fit with the end of the First Fytte. In the original tale, the Knight is away on an overseas military campaign, but unexpectedly re-appears. He orders his men to put on their ragged travelling clothes before approaching the abbey. His men and the horses are led to the stables, as the Knight, also in ragged clothes, enters the great hall. Note that Little John is never mentioned, nor is the Abbey named. Near the end of the Fytte, the Knight resumes his good clothing, leaving his ragged clothes at the abbey.
 The rest of this Fytte appears to be fragments of other tales, perhaps compiled by the Gest poet. The light-hearted fragment describing how the Knight prepares to repay Robin Hood has an internal consistency, and is reminiscent of the opening lines of the First Fytte. The fair at Wentbridge may have been taken from another tale to be used as a plot device to delay the Knight, thus preparing for the tale of Robin Hood and the Monk in the Fourth Fytte.
 Tale B, Episode 1 (Third Fytte)
 This episode probably consists of three or four now-lost tales. The light-hearted opening scene at the archery shoot could have been borrowed from any of the then-popular tales. After which the Gest poet inserted two quatrains which refer to Little John's courteous master from whom the Sheriff must secure permission. The second now-lost tale is definitely low comedy. The audience is told that Little John is seeking vengeance on the Sheriff for some unspecified action. When Little John is denied breakfast because he slept in, the subsequent action of "exuberant rough-house" "turns into a scene of total destruction", as Little John picks a fight with the butler. The tale then assumes "an air of carnival 'justice'", when he breaks into the pantry to eat and drink his fill.
 However, the third tale has a somber tone, as Little John lures the Sheriff into an ambush. Instead of killing them all, Robin makes the Sheriff and his men endure a night on the cold wet ground, wearing nothing but a green mantle.
 The last few lines of the Fytte were probably written by the Gest poet. The Sheriff's complains that he would rather have Robin "smite off mine head" than spend another night in the greenwood. Robin then demands the Sheriff swear an oath on Robin's sword not to harm Robin or his men. This little scene is a foreshadow of the scene in Tale B, Episode 3 (Sixth Fytte), where Robin Hood uses his sword to decapititate the Sheriff as punishment for breaking his oath.

 Tale A, Episode 3a (Fourth Fytte)
 The Second Fytte ended with the Knight being delayed at the fair at Wentbridge. The Fourth Fytte opens with Robin Hood worrying about the Knight's late arrival. It's not about the money; he is fretting about why the Virgin Mary is upset with him. This is the Gest poet's introduction to yet another now-lost tale about Robin and the Monk. This tale is also the ending of the Miracle story, as Little John recognizes that the Monk carries the debt repayment which was ensured by the Virgin Mary.At the beginning of the Monk tale, there is another inconsistency. When first spotted by Little John, there were two monks. Later, at the feast, there is only one monk mentioned.
 Tale A, Episode 3b (Fourth Fytte)
 The last part of the Fytte is the ending of Tale A. This reunion and reconciliation of Robin and the Knight was most probably original material written by the Gest poet.
 Tale B, Episode 2 (Fifth Fytte)
 The original now-lost tale probably consisted of the archery match, the subsequent attack by the Sheriff's men, the wounding of Little John, and the flight into the greenwood.(lines ) No parallels have been found among the extant contemporary tales. The remainder of the Fytte was composed by the Gest poet.
 Tale B, Episode 3 (Sixth Fytte)
 The original now-lost tale probably consisted of the sheriff capturing a gentle knight, taking him to Nottingham, the knight's wife begging Robin to save her husband, the subsequent skirmish, and the rescued knight becoming a fugitive in Robin's group. Once again, there are no parallels to be found among the extant contemporary tales. The remainder of the Fytte was composed by the Gest poet.
 Tale C, Episode 1 (Seventh Fytte)
 Separately from the Robin Hood ballads, Child discussed the "King and Subject" ballad tradition, in which the King (in disguise) meets with one of his Subjects.[Child, V, pt 1] He mentions in passing that the Seventh and Eighth Fyttes of Gest contains such a tale.[p 69] Both Child and Clawson dismiss The King's Disguise, and Friendship with Robin Hood (Child 151), (the only extant Robin Hood ballad involving the king) as being an 18th century paraphrase of Gest. Curiously, both also discuss two tales, King Edward and the Shepherd[Rochester] and The King and the Hermit,[Rochester] as being very similar to the original ballad underlying the Seventh Fytte, but never make the connection. Clawson simply remarks that "tales like this are common and popular the world over". However, Thomas Ohlgren considers the parallels between the two tales as part of the evidence supporting his assertion that "our comely king" in Gest was Edward III. (See Historical Analysis)
 Tale C, Episode 2 (Eighth Fytte)
 Both Child and Clawson are silent on possible sources for this Fytte.

 Narrative arc 
The sequence of the tales and episodes in Gest is confusing to most modern readers accustomed to novels with chronological chapters. Maddicott referred to this confusing sequence as the "disjointed lack of artistic unity" resulting from "a medley of material from various now vanished ballads or tales".[1978_Maddicott, p 233] However, this view does not recognize that the people listening to the tales knew them by heart. Langland and the Scottish chroniclers all remark on the extreme popularity of the RH rhymes(see here). Perhaps the Gest poet purposefully retained what Gray referred to as "loose ends" — the awkward transitions between episodes, the inconsistencies, the jumping back & forth between tales. Perhaps the Gest poet wanted his audience to recognize the original tales (similar to the old game show Name That Tune), because the he wanted his changes to stand out. According to Clawson, Francis B Gummere coined the phrase "leaping and lingering" to describe the technique used in many ballads to skip over unimportant events or details in order to dwell on the important ones. The Gest poet leapt from one well-known tale to another in order to dwell on scenes in which he could show who Robin Hood really was. Only the episodes of Tale A are provided here as examples.

 Tale A, Episodes 1, 2, and 3

 Character descriptions 
Most of the main characters are described in 52 lines at the beginning of the poem. Thus the Gest poet immediately draws attention to the purpose of his work. Gests scenes are constructed to show the difference in the behavior of good and wicked characters. Goodness (referred to as "Courtesy") is displayed as ethical or moral qualities, such as kindness, generosity, truthfulness, and personal loyalty. "Courtesy" (the word occurs 17 times in Gest) is the opposite of injustice.

 Robin Hood
 good yeomanSee Historical Analysis section for a fuller description of yeoman as used in Gest.
 proud outlawThis is the only time 'proud' is applied to Robin Hood; but it is applied to the Sheriff of Nottingham 20 times throughout the Gest. The word is being used in 2 different senses (meanings). When applied to the Sheriff, proud means 'haughty, arrogant'. When applied to Robin, proud means 'brave, bold, valiant', or 'noble in bearing or appearance'.
 courteous outlawIn Middle English, courtesy meant 'refined, well-mannered, polite' and 'gracious, benevolent, generous, merciful'. Robin repeatedly exhibits all these traits.
 devoutRobin hears three masses a day, and has a special devotion to the Virgin Mary. The latter is a strong motivator for him in Tale A.
 leadershipRobin is able to impose a code of conduct upon his fellow outlaws. He insists that they can do "well enough" by not waylaying farmers, yeomen, or any knight or squire who is a "good fellow". He singles out bishops and archbishops for beatings. Robin has a particularly strong hostility for the Sheriff of Nottingham.
 Little John
 He defers to Robin by calling him "Master", and serves as Robin's right-hand man. But he is not reluctant in letting Robin know how he feels about following his orders. He agrees to follow Robin's code of conduct for the fellowship, but shows his concern (or irritation) when Robin insists on finding a stranger for dinner so late in the day.
 Much, the miller's son
 Apparently of short stature, Much is praised as every "inch of his body ... worth a man". In Tale B, Much saves a wounded Little John by carrying him on his back.

The remaining characters are described when they appear in the tale. Each character is described by one or more of their ethical or moral qualities. There are only three characters who are given a physical description.
 The Sorrowful Knight
 The Gest poet spends eight lines describing his physical appearance. Little John, a good judge of people, calls him "gentle", "courteous", & "noble". These qualities the Knight demonstrates repeatedly in Tales A and B.
 The Greedy Abbot and the Kind-hearted Prior
 The qualities of these two characters are revealed during their conversation at dinner, while awaiting the arrival of the Knight. The Abbot compounds his wickedness with a lie by calling the Knight "false".
 The Chief Steward
 He is introduced as "a fat-headed monk", emphasizing the fat cheeks and neck under his monk's tonsure. Little John calls him "a churl monk"; insulting the monk twice with a single word. In Middle English it meant a person lacking in courtesy, or a person of low birth.
 Sheriff of Nottingham
 He is the stereotypical wicked villain with no redeeming qualities. He lies when he tells the King that the Knight is a traitor, but later becomes a traitor himself by breaking his oath to Robin.
 King Edward
 See Historical Analysis section for a fuller description of the character of "our comely King".

Notes

References

External links

A Gest of Robyn Hode (Modernized)
A Gest of Robyn Hode (Original)

Middle English poems